Periboeum atylodes is a species of beetle in the family Cerambycidae. It was described by Salvador in 1978.

References

Elaphidiini
Beetles described in 1978